The 2019 Parramatta Eels season was the 73rd in the club's history. Coached by Brad Arthur and captained by Clinton Gutherson, they competed in the NRL's 2019 Telstra Premiership.

Summary
Before the start of the 2019 NRL season, Parramatta were predicted by many to finish towards the bottom of the table or claim another wooden spoon.  The club started off the year with back to back victories over Penrith and arch rivals Canterbury-Bankstown.  In round 6 of the 2019 NRL season, Parramatta played their first game at the new Western Sydney Stadium against the Wests Tigers and ran out 51–6 winners in front of a sold-out crowd.

In round 9 against Melbourne, Parramatta suffered one of their worst ever defeats losing 64–10 at Suncorp Stadium.  In the aftermath of the defeat, coach Brad Arthur and the players were placed under intense scrutiny but just a week after the loss, Arthur was given a two-year contract extension by the Parramatta board.  The club would then go on to lose against North Queensland and last placed Penrith in the coming weeks.

Between round 12 and round 22 of the 2019 season, Parramatta would go on to win eight of their ten games.  In round 22 against the Gold Coast Titans, Parramatta qualified for the 2019 finals series with a 36–12 victory at Cbus Super Stadium.

At the end of the 2019 regular season, Parramatta finished fifth on the table. In the elimination final against Brisbane, Parramatta won the match 58–0 at the new Western Sydney Stadium.  The victory was the biggest finals win in history, eclipsing Newtown's 55–7 win over St. George in 1944.  The match was also Parramatta's biggest win over Brisbane and Brisbane's worst ever loss since entering the competition in 1988.
The following week against Melbourne in the elimination semi final, Parramatta were defeated 32–0 at AAMI Park which ended their season.  The loss against Melbourne was also the sixth time Parramatta had been defeated by Melbourne in a finals game since 1999.

Standings

Fixtures

Pre-season

Home and away season

Finals series

Players and staff
The playing squad and coaching staff of the Parramatta Eels for the 2019 NRL season as of 28 July 2019.

Transfers

In:

Out:

References 

Parramatta Eels seasons
Parramatta Eels season